Delta  is a federal electoral district in British Columbia, Canada, that was represented in the House of Commons of Canada from 1988 to 1997 and since 2015.

History 
The 1988–1997 edition of this riding was created in 1987 from parts of Fraser Valley West, Richmond—South Delta and Surrey—White Rock—North Delta ridings. During this period of time, the riding consisted of the District Municipality of Delta and the southwest part of the District Municipality of Surrey. It was abolished in 1996, and became part of Delta—South Richmond.

The riding was recreated following the 2012 federal electoral boundaries redistribution. The boundaries for this edition of the riding are perfectly coterminal with the District Municipality of Delta. The riding was created from parts of Newton—North Delta and Delta—Richmond East. These new boundaries were legally defined in the 2013 representation order, which came into effect upon the call of the 42nd Canadian federal election, scheduled for October 2015.

Demographics

Members of Parliament 

The riding has elected the following Members of Parliament:

Election results

2015–present

1987–1996

See also 

 List of Canadian federal electoral districts
 Past Canadian electoral districts

Historic ridings with the name Delta:

Burnaby—Richmond—Delta (1970–1976)
Delta—Richmond East (2003 - )
Newton—North Delta (2003 - )
Richmond—South Delta (1976–1987)
Surrey—White Rock—North Delta (1976–1987)

Notes

References

External links 

 Website of the Parliament of Canada
 Riding history from the Library of Parliament

Former federal electoral districts of British Columbia
British Columbia federal electoral districts
Federal electoral districts in Greater Vancouver and the Fraser Valley
Politics of Delta, British Columbia